CEO×NJPW: When Worlds Collide was a professional wrestling event promoted by New Japan Pro-Wrestling (NJPW). The event took place on June 29, 2018, at the Ocean Center in Daytona Beach, Florida alongside the Community Effort Orlando (CEO) fighting game event. The event aired for free on CEO Gaming's official Twitch channel.

The card comprised eight matches, including three on the pre-show. In the main event, the Golden☆Lovers (Kenny Omega and Kota Ibushi) defeated Los Ingobernables de Japón (Tetsuya Naito and Hiromu Takahashi) in a tag team match.

Production

Background
On May 14, 2018, New Japan Pro-Wrestling (NJPW) announced a partnership with Community Effort Orlando (CEO) to produce a crossover professional wrestling show called CEO×NJPW: When Worlds Collide. The event was scheduled to be held on June 29, 2018, at the Ocean Center in Daytona Beach, Florida as part of CEO's fighting game event that year. This partnership came by way of NJPW wrestler Kenny Omega. The event card was officially announced on June 26.

Storylines
CEO×NJPW: When Worlds Collide comprised eight professional wrestling matches, including three on the pre-show, that involved different wrestlers from pre-existing scripted feuds and storylines. Wrestlers portrayed heroes, villains, or less distinguishable characters in scripted events that built tension and culminated in a wrestling match or series of matches.

Aftermath
For CEO's 2019 fighting game event, the company partnered with All Elite Wrestling (AEW), which was founded earlier that year in January. Just like the 2018 event, this partnership came by way of Kenny Omega, who left NJPW in January 2019 and signed with AEW as an executive vice president and wrestler in February. This CEO event with AEW was called Fyter Fest, in which the name, logo, and slogan of the event parodied the fraudulent Fyre Festival. Fyter Fest has since continued as an annual event for AEW but without CEO.

Results

See also

2018 in professional wrestling

References

External links
New Japan Pro-Wrestling official website
CEO⨯NJPW: When Worlds Collide official website

New Japan Pro-Wrestling shows
2018 in professional wrestling
June 2018 events in the United States
Professional wrestling in Florida
Events in Daytona Beach, Florida
2018 in professional wrestling in Florida